Catinaria is a genus of lichenized fungi in the family Ramalinaceae.

Species

Catinaria acrustacea
Catinaria albocincta
Catinaria athallina
Catinaria atomaria
Catinaria atropurpurea
Catinaria dispersa
Catinaria intermixta
Catinaria isidiza
Catinaria kelungana
Catinaria leucoplaca
Catinaria microcarpa
Catinaria neuschildii
Catinaria subcorallina

References

Ramalinaceae
Lichen genera
Lecanorales genera
Taxa named by Edvard August Vainio